Michael Ernest O'Nan (August 9, 1943, Fort Knox, Kentucky – July 31, 2017, Princeton, New Jersey) was an American mathematician, specializing in group theory.

O'Nan received his PhD in 1970 from Princeton University under Daniel Gorenstein with thesis A Characterization of the Three-Dimensional Projective Unitary Group over a Finite Field. He was a professor at Rutgers University. In 1976 he found strong evidence for the existence of a sporadic group, which Charles Sims constructed. The group is now named the O'Nan group after O'Nan.

The O'Nan–Scott theorem in group theory is also named after O'Nan, who discovered it independently from Leonard Scott. It describes the maximal subgroups of the symmetric groups.

Selected works
 Linear Algebra (= Eagle Mathematics Series. vol. 2A). Harcourt Brace Jovanovich, New York NY, 1971,  (2nd edition.1976, ; 3rd edition. with Herbert Enderton. Harcourt Brace Jovanovich, San Diego CA, 1990).

References

1943 births
2017 deaths
20th-century American mathematicians
Group theorists
Princeton University alumni
Rutgers University faculty
21st-century American mathematicians
People from Hardin County, Kentucky